Joshiy (born 18 July 1952) is an Indian film director and scriptwriter who works predominantly in Malayalam cinema. He has also directed Tamil, Hindi, Telugu and Kannada language films. He is a pioneer of action thrillers in Malayalam cinema. His films are known for its stylized imagery, color grading and film noir.

He made his directorial debut in the 1978 film Tiger Salim. However, it was the 1980 film Moorkhan that was his breakthrough in Malayalam cinema. In the following years he directed a series of successful films, establishing himself as one of the major figures of the Malayalam film industry. Following the success of Moorkhan he directed several films in the early 80's featuring Prem Nazir in the lead role. Some notable films from this period include Kaahalam (1981), Raktham (1981), Aarambham (1982) and Kodumkattu (1983). In 1984, he remade Aarambham into Hindi as Dharm Aur Qanoon (1984), which was a major critical and commercial success. 

In 1983, he directed Aa Raathri which starred Mammootty in the lead role. He would continue to direct several successful films throughout the late 80's and the 90's. His most notable films include Sandharbham (1984), Nirakkottu (1985), Shyama (1986), New Delhi (1987), Sangham (1988), Mahayanam (1989), No.20 Madras Mail (1990), Kauravar (1992), Dhruvam (1993), Sainyam (1994), Lelam (1997) and Pathram (1999). The 2000's and the early 2010's would see his career take a commercial downturn. After the failure of the 2015 film Lailaa O Lailaa, he took a 4 year hiatus from direction and made a comeback with the 2019 film Porinju Mariam Jose.

Personal life
Joshiy is married to Sindhu. The couple have a son, Abhilash, and a daughter, Aishwarya, who died in a car accident in Chennai in July 2011. Abhilash is married to Varsha. His son, Abhilash is going to make his directorial debut with King of Kotha.

Career
Born at Varkala in Thiruvananthapuram district as the son of Vasu and Gouri, Joshiy's relation with cinema began from the cinema theatre that his family owned. While doing his final year in degree, in 1969, Joshiy left to Chennai to try his luck in cinema. Joshiy began his career by working as an assistant director under eminent film directors M. Krishnan Nair and J. Sasikumar. He also assisted Crossbelt Mani and he was the assistant director of Aanayum Ambariyum in 1978 film directed by Crossbelt Mani. He made his debut as director through Tiger Salim, released in 1978. His next movie was Moorkhan which was followed by Raktham. He directed Prem Nazir, Srividya in Ithihasam.

Following this, Joshiy directed many films including Kaahalam, Sharam, Karthavyam, Dheera and Aarambham. In 1983, he collaborated with Mammootty for the first time, for Aa Rathri, which was a blockbuster and broke many records in the box office, the film became the first Malayalam film to gross over 1 crore. He continued to work together with Mammootty for the next two decades. This was followed by Kodumkattu, came out and a series of films including Bhookambam, Kodathi, Alakadalinakkare, Muhurtham Pathnonnu Muppathinu and Minimol Vathicanil and Sandharbham, his second industrial hit after Aa Rathri.

In 1985, Joshiy directed Nirakkoottu, based on the script by debutant Dennis Joseph. Joshiy, Mammootty, and Dennis Joseph continued working together with Nyayavidhi, Shyama and Veendum. He made his debut in Hindi films in 1984 and achieved national fame when he directed Dharm Aur Qanoon starring Rajesh Khanna in a double role along with Dharmendra.

The films Veendum, Nyayavidhi, Aayiram Kannukal, Sayam Sandhya, Kshamichu Ennoru Vakku followed. In the same year, Joshiy directed New Delhi under Jubilee Productions which was a blockbuster and the highest grossing Malayalam film at the time ( his third Industrial hit ) and was a comeback film for Mammootty. In 1987, he directed Itihaas (1987 film), starring Raaj Kumar in the lead in Hindi, which was remake of Ithihasam. In 1988, Joshiy directed three films, all scripted by Dennis Joseph and Mammootty in the lead role - Dhinarathrangal, Sangham and Thanthram. In 1989, Joshiy once again teamed with Mohanlal for Naduvazhikal. In the same year, Joshiy brought out a military film. Nair Saab, completely shot in Kashmir, with Mammootty in the title role. Mahayanam, his third film of the year. No.20 Madras Mail was released in 1990 with Mohanlal in lead role, followed by the investigation thriller Ee Thanutha Veluppan Kalathu. Kuttettan was his third film of that year. Joshiy's next film was Kauravar in 1992, again with Mammootty in lead role. Joshiy in 1992, tried his hand in Tamil cinema, with Airport.

In 1993, Dhruvam got released, followed by Sainyam in 1994. His debut into Telugu cinema was in 1994 through Angarakshugudu, starring Rajashekhar and Meena in leading roles. In 1997 Joshiy brought out Bhoopathi with Suresh Gopi in the lead role.  Joshiy joined with Suresh Gopi and Renji Panicker for Lelam and Pathram in 1997 and 1999, respectively. In middle, Joshiy did Vazhunnor with Suresh Gopi in the lead role. Joshiy's next two films were Praja and Dubai in 2001 which performed poorly at the box office. He took a break after these films. In 2004, Joshiy made a comeback with Runway, this time Dileep in the leading role and was followed by Maambazhakkaalam. Naran released in 2005 starring Mohanlal, followed by Lion in 2006.

His next films included Pothan Vava (2006) and July 4 (2007) followed by Nasrani (2007) and Janmam (2007). In 2008 he directed Twenty:20 bringing together almost all Mollywood actors. It was followed by the thriller Robinhood in 2009. Christian Brothers released in 2011, a multi-star film with Mohanlal, Suresh Gopi, Dileep and Sarath Kumar. In 2012, he directed Run Baby Run, another film with Mohanlal in the lead. It was followed by Lokpal in 2013 and Salaam Kashmier 2014 with Jayaram and Suresh Gopi in lead roles. In 2015, Joshiy directed Lailaa O Lailaa. After a four-year hiatus, Joshiy made a comeback with the hit movie Porinju Mariam Jose.

Filmography

References

External links

20th-century Indian film directors
Malayalam film directors
Film directors from Thiruvananthapuram
Living people
21st-century Indian film directors
People from Varkala
1952 births